The Lamian War, or the Hellenic War (323–322 BC) was fought by a coalition of cities including Athens and the Aetolian League against Macedon and its ally Boeotia. The war broke out after the death of the King of Macedon, Alexander the Great, and was part of a series of attempts to challenge Macedonian hegemony over mainland Greece.

The war takes its name from the protracted siege of the Macedonian forces at Lamia. Although the Athenian coalition was initially successful against the Macedonian forces in Europe, their inability to take the city of Lamia and their failure to retain control of the sea gave the Macedonians time to bring reinforcements from Asia and secure victory.

Prelude
In 324 BC, Alexander the Great had the Exiles Decree proclaimed in Greece. The effect of this decree was that citizens of Greek cities that had previously been exiled would be able to return to their cities of origin. Though this affected many of the cities of Greece, two regions where this had a major effect were Athens and the Aetolian League. This was a problem for the Aetolians as they had previously occupied the city of Oeniadae and evicted the original inhabitants of the city, settling it with their own citizens. Similarly, the Athenians had taken over and colonized the island of Samos. The outcome of the decree was that the Aetolians and Athenians would be required to surrender control of these occupied territories. The hostility to Macedonian suzerainty was compounded by a grain shortage in Greece, worsened by the fact the Alexander was requisitioning supplies for his campaigns in the East.

Outbreak of war
The death of Alexander in 323 BC left Macedon in the midst of a succession crisis, with no universally accepted successor to the throne. While awaiting the birth of the child of Alexander, a regency headed by Perdiccas was formed for the yet unborn child and the mentally deficient brother of Alexander, Philip III. News of his death was considered by the Athenians as an opportunity to shatter the Macedonian hegemony. After vigorous debate in the ecclesia, it was determined – despite the opposition of prominent individuals such as Demades and Phocion – that Athens would wage war against Macedon.

Making use of 50 talents that had been seized from Harpalus, the treasurer of Alexander who had fled to Athens, the Athenians sent the commander Leosthenes to Taenarum with the aim of engaging mercenaries. Leosthenes was given the order by the ecclesia to make it appear that he was engaging the mercenaries on his own behalf, so as to give Athens additional time to prepare for the upcoming war.

Battles

The total anti-Macedonian force at the outset of the war appears to have been 30,000 strong and was composed of up to 15,000 Athenians, 12,000 Aetolians, and various contingents of mercenary forces. The Athenian forces commanded by Leosthenes had some initial successes defeating the Boeotians at Plataea.

Antipater, commander of the Macedonian forces in Europe, meanwhile scrambled to assemble Macedonian troops, most of which were engaged in Asia or in transit to or from that continent. He set out against the Athenians with an initial force of some 13,000 troops, with messages sent to various commanders to bring reinforcements. With him, he took a fleet of over 110 battleships and the cavalry of Thessaly.    

The Thessalians originally sided with Antipater, but were quickly persuaded to join the Athenians as allies. Together, they defeated Antipater at Thermopylae. The defeated Macedonians fled to the fortified city of Lamia, where they were besieged by the Athenians as Antipater waited for reinforcements to arrive from Asia. The Athenians and their allies, despite their early successes, were bogged down in their siege of Lamia. The well-walled town proved impregnable to the Athenians, and their commander Leosthenes was mortally wounded during a surprise sortie from the city by the Macedonians who sought to harass their ditch-digging besiegers. His death prompted the Athenians to retreat.

That year Hypereides pronounced the funeral oration over the dead including his friend Leosthenes. Antiphilus was appointed as his replacement. Soon after the Athenian retreat from the walls of Lamia, Macedonian reinforcements (20,000 infantry and 1,500 cavalry) arrived from Asia under the command of Leonnatus. The Athenian naval fleet had been defeated at the Battle of Amorgos (322 BC).

Once the Macedonians had control of the sea, Craterus was able to transfer troops from Asia to Europe. Though the Athenians defeated Leonnatus and his reinforcements at an unknown location in Thessaly, Antipater was able to escape from Lamia. Combined with the remnants of the defeated army and with further forces brought from Asia by Craterus, the Macedonians finally defeated the Athenian coalition in 322 at the Battle of Crannon in central Thessaly. Together they beat back the weary Athenians in a long series of cavalry and hoplite engagements. Although the allied forces were not routed, the outcome was decisive enough to compel the Athenians and their allies to sue for peace on Antipater’s terms.

Outcome

Earlier, Antipater made peace treaties with the defeated cities separately on generous terms, in order to disband the Greek alliance against Macedonia. The Athenians and Aetolians were left on their own.  The Athenians were forced to dissolve their democracy and establish a plutocratic system in its stead, whereby only the 9,000 richest citizens were left in exclusive possession of the city.  The 12,000 poorest men, or 60% of the entire citizenship, were permanently exiled.

Many other Greek cities met a similar fate.  Antipater often installed in each a subservient oligarchy and a Macedonian garrison, and executed democrats and champions of self-determination.

Hypereides was condemned to death, fled, and was probably captured and killed in Euboea. Demosthenes committed suicide to avoid being captured and tortured by Macedonian exile hunters.

Historiography

The 19th-century radical politician and historian George Grote considered the outcome of the Lamian War a calamitous tragedy, marking the extinction of an "autonomous Hellenic world". On his account, it extinguished free speech in Greece and dispersed the Athenian Demos to distant lands.  Nevertheless, the war, in spite of its disastrous result, was a "glorious effort for the recovery of Grecian liberty, undertaken under circumstances which promised a fair chance of success."

References

Bibliography

Ancient sources
Diodorus Siculus Bibliotheke 17-18. Translation on Lacus Curtius
 Hypereides, Funeral Oration
 Plutarch, Lives, Phocion 23–29 and Demosthenes 27–30.

Modern sources
 Ashton, N. G. "The Lamian War. A false start?" Antichthon 17 (1983) 47-63.
 Ashton, N. G. "The Lamian War-stat magni nominis umbra" The Journal of Hellenic Studies, Vol. 104, (1984), pp. 152–157
 Brill's New Pauly vol. 7 (2005) pp. 183.
 Errington, R. M. "Samos and the Lamian war." Chiron 5 (1975) 51-57.
 Martin, G., "Antipater after the Lamian War: New Readings in Vat. Gr. 73 (Dexippus fr. 33)". The Classical Quarterly, New Series, Vol. 55, No. 1 (2005), pp. 301–305
 Oikonomides, A. N. "Athens and the Phokians at the outbreak of the Lamian War (= IG II 367)." The Ancient World 5 (1982) pp. 123–127.
 Schmitt, O., Der Lamische Krieg (1992)
 Walsh, J., "Historical Method and a Chronological Problem in Diodorus, Book 18" In P. Wheatley and R. Hannah (eds), Alexander and His Successors: Essays from the Antipodes (Claremont: 2009) 72-88.
 Walsh, J., "The Lamiaka of Choerilus and the Genesis of the term 'Lamian War'." Classical Quarterly (2011) 61.2: 538–44.
 Westlake, H. D. "The Aftermath of the Lamian War." Classical Review 63 (1949) 87-90

 
320s BC conflicts
Wars involving Athens
Wars involving Macedonia (ancient kingdom)
Regency of Antipater
History of Lamia (city)